Société d'étude et de réalisation d'engins balistiques  (lit. Company for the Study and Production of Ballistic Devices) or SÉREB was a French aviation company.

History
The company name has also been spelled slightly differently as Société d'études et de réalisation d'engins balistiques. 

SEREB was created initially to develop two-stage ballistic missiles for nuclear weapons (Force de dissuasion nucléaire française). CNES was formed in 1961, which took over much development of civilian research. 

Examples of the work of SEREB can be found at the Musée de l’air et de l’espace (Air and Space Museum) at Paris–Le Bourget Airport.

Merger
The company merged with Nord Aviation in 1970 to form the much more well-known Aerospatiale (Aerospace), which began as Société nationale industrielle aérospatiale (SNIAS). This merged company became defunct in July 2000, joining EADS (European Aeronautic Defence and Space Company).

Structure
It was headquartered at the Centre d’achèvement et d’essais des propulseurs et engins (CAEPE) at Saint-Médard-en-Jalles, Gironde in the large Nouvelle-Aquitaine department in western France, north of the Arrondissement of Bordeaux. The site was known as the Centre d’achèvement des propulseurs et engins between 1962 and 1964, run by the Direction générale de l'armement (DGA).

Today, the area is a main site for rocket engine development. Groupe SNPE was formed there in 1971. Snecma Propulsion Solide was there from 2005 to 2012 at Le Haillan. SEREB is now Airbus Safran Launchers (previously Astrium Space Transportation).

Products
 Saphir (rocket), two stage rocket

See also
 French space program

References

External links
 History of Ariane

Aérospatiale
Companies based in Nouvelle-Aquitaine
Defunct aircraft manufacturers of France
French companies established in 1959
Gironde
Manufacturing companies established in 1959
Manufacturing companies disestablished in 1970
Rocket engine manufacturers of France
Space program of France